Separatist movements of Nigeria want to achieve state secession, which is the withdrawal of one or more states from the multinational Federal Republic of Nigeria. The only act of secession in Nigeria occurred from 1967 to 1970 during the Nigerian Civil War, when the breakaway republic of Biafra declared its independence from Nigeria and was eventually defeated. Ever since then, Nigeria has experienced the emergence of separatist movements seeking the independence of Biafra as well as other proposed states.

History

Colonial era

1914
Separatist sentiments first occurred in 1914, when Frederick Lugard unified the Northern Nigeria Protectorate (predominantly Muslim) and the Southern Nigeria Protectorate (predominantly pagan/animist and Christian) into the single colony of Nigeria>Ahmadu Bello in his autobiography noted the unpopularity in Northern Nigeria of the merger, likely referring to the native Islamic rulers of Northern Nigeria.

1950s
As Nigeria was transitioning towards self-rule during the 1950s, new constitutional arrangements and rivalries between political parties intensified secessionist rhetoric. A particular point of contention centered around Lagos, which was the capital of Nigeria at the time. Delegates from the predominantly Igbo Eastern Region regarded Lagos as a "no man's land", while delegates from the predominantly Yoruba Western Region regarded Lagos to be a culturally Yoruba city to be governed strictly on their terms. Obafemi Awolowo, the premier of Western Region, sent a letter which stated the freedom of Western Region to "decide whether or not they will remain on the proposed Nigerian Federation", implicitly threatening secession.

Post-independence
Secessionist sentiments re-emerged during the federal election of December 1964 and the Western Region election of 1965. President Nnamdi Azikiwe stated:

However, in response, Ahmadu Bello reiterated the 1963 constitution of Nigeria had no provision for secession.

Separatist movements
Separatist movements include:
 The Indigenous People of Biafra (IPOB) and its arm wing the Eastern Security Network who support the independence of Biafra. They are allied with the Anglophone Cameroonian independence movement.
 The Oduduwa Republic, a Yoruba secessionist movement,
 The Arewa Republic, in the North of the country,
 The Niger Delta Republic, supported by the Niger Delta Liberation Front and the Movement for the Emancipation of the Niger Delta, leading to the 2016 Niger Delta conflict.

As of 2021, according to the US Council on Foreign Relations, only a minority of the Igbo and the Yoruba support separatism.

References

Sources 
 

 
Political organizations based in Nigeria